Theodor Barth (16 July 1849, Duderstadt – 3 June 1909, Baden-Baden) was a German liberal politician and publicist. He was a member of the Reichstag between 1881 and 1884, between 1885 and 1898, and between 1901 and 1903.

Career
Barth started his political career with the National Liberal Party. He soon rejected the Manchesterism of the old liberals, though, and claimed that liberalism needed a social programme. To that end, he sought the cooperation of the Social Democrats, and at multiple times voted against his own party. In the German Freeminded Party (Freisinnige Partei), founded in 1884, Barth would soon find himself opposed to the leadership of Eugen Richter. When the Freeminded Party split in 1893, Barth became a member of the Freeminded Union (Freisinnigen Vereinigung), instead of the Freeminded People's Party of Richter. In 1903, Friedrich Naumann would join the Freeminded Union as well. Barth however would found the Democratic Union (Demokratische Vereinigung) in 1908, together with Rudolf Breitscheid and Hellmut von Gerlach, after the Freeminded Union's participation in the Bülow-Block coalition in the 1907 elections.

Barth founded the liberal weekly Die Nation (The Nation) in 1883 and remained as editor until his death in 1909.

See also
Liberalism
Liberalism in Germany

References

1849 births
1909 deaths
People from Duderstadt
People from the Kingdom of Hanover
German Protestants
National Liberal Party (Germany) politicians
Liberal Union (Germany) politicians
German Free-minded Party politicians
Free-minded Union politicians
Democratic Union (Germany) politicians
Members of the 5th Reichstag of the German Empire
Members of the 7th Reichstag of the German Empire
Members of the 8th Reichstag of the German Empire
Members of the 9th Reichstag of the German Empire
Members of the 10th Reichstag of the German Empire
Members of the Prussian House of Representatives